Abbotsmith Glacier is a well-defined glacier,  long, descending from the ice-covered west slopes of Big Ben to the west side of Heard Island in the southern Indian Ocean. The glacier lies between Walsh and Henderson Bluffs. Surveyed in 1948 by the ANARE (Australian National Antarctic Research Expeditions) who named it for John Abbotsmith, engineer with the party.

To the south of Abbotsmith Glacier is Lied Glacier, while Allison Glacier is immediately to the north.

References

 

Glaciers of Heard Island and McDonald Islands